Mongolodus is an extinct genus of protoconodonts.

References

External links 
 
 

Conodont genera
Cambrian conodonts
Paleozoic life of Newfoundland and Labrador
Fossil taxa described in 1977

Cambrian genus extinctions